Jaws or Jaw may refer to:

Anatomy
 Jaw, an opposable articulated structure at the entrance of the mouth
 Mandible, the lower jaw

Arts, entertainment, and media 
 Jaws (James Bond), a character in The Spy Who Loved Me and Moonraker
 Jaws (novel), a novel by Peter Benchley
 Jaws (ride), a theme park attraction based on the film series
 Jaws (video game), a 1987 NES video game, based on the film

Films
 Jaws (franchise)
Jaws (film), a 1975 American film directed by Steven Spielberg based on the novel by Peter Benchley
Jaws 2, a 1978 American film
Jaws 3-D, a 1983 American film
Jaws: The Revenge, a 1987 American film

Music
 Jaws (soundtrack)
 Jaws (album), a 1958 album by Eddie "Lockjaw" Davis
 JAWS (band), an English surf pop/alternative rock band from Birmingham
 Jaws, a song by Lemon Demon from the EP Nature Tapes

People 
 Jaw (Ćehu′pa) (c. 1850–1924), Hunkpapa Lakota winter count keeper and ledger art artist 
 Jaw Shaw-kong, Taiwanese media personality and politician
 Aaron Homoki, American professional skateboarder
 Ron Jaworski, American football quarterback
 Joe Jordan (footballer), Scottish footballer and coach
 Colin Lloyd, English darts player
 Darrell Waltrip, American race car driver

Computing 
 JAWS (screen reader), for blind and vision-impaired computer users
 JAWS Scripting Language, a proprietary programming language
 Java Web Start or JAWS, a system for launching Java applications outside of a web browser

Other uses
 Jaws (beach), a big-wave surfing area in Hawaii
 Japan Anthropology Workshop, abbreviated JAWS
 Jaffe Wins Above Replacement Score (JAWS), a sabermetric tool for evaluating a baseball player's Hall of Fame worthiness

See also 
 Grab (tool), a pair of mechanical jaws
 Hydraulic rescue tools, of which one brand is known as the "Jaws of Life"
 Jaww, a village in Bahrain
 Open jaw, or open-jaw, ticket, an airline return ticket whose destination and origin differ